Victor Amadeus of Savoy (Vittorio Amedeo Filippo Giuseppe; 6 May 1699 – 22 March 1715) was the eldest son of Victor Amadeus II, Duke of Savoy and his French wife Anne Marie d'Orléans. He was the heir apparent of Savoy from his birth and as such was styled as the Prince of Piedmont. He acted as Regent of Savoy from September 1713 till September 1714 in the absences of his father. He died of smallpox at the age of 15.

Biography

The Prince of Piedmont was born in Turin on 6 May 1699. He was the fifth child and first son of his parents, Victor Amadeus II of Savoy and Anne Marie d'Orléans, and was baptised with the names Victor Amadeus John Philip. He remained close to his father all his life. Though his parents were not close he also had a close relationship with his mother, a niece of Louis XIV of France.

From birth he was styled as the Prince of Piedmont, the typical style for the heir apparent to the Duke of Savoy. Victor Amadeus was born at a time when the House of Savoy was in need of a male heir to succeed as the duchy observed Salic law which forbade females to inherit the throne. His birth was greeted with great celebration and throughout his life, his health required constant attention. During the Battle of Turin, he, his mother, grandmother and younger brother, Charles Emmanuel, had to flee Turin for their safety and go to Genoa. His father took part in the battle which was played out to west of the city. The prince was moved from female care in 1708.

In 1713, at the end of the War of the Spanish Succession, by the Treaty of Utrecht, Sicily was ceded to the Duke of Savoy, Victor Amadeus's father. As such, Victor Amadeus became the heir to a kingdom rather than just a duchy. In September his parents set off for Palermo in Sicily in order to be crowned officially. Victor Amadeus II asked his mother, Marie Jeanne of Savoy, to maintain a regency in his absence but she declined and the younger Victor Amadeus was given the post. Victor Amadeus's regency ended when his father returned in September 1714. Strained relations between Savoy and Austria caused plans for the Prince of Piedmont to wed Maria Amalia, a daughter of the late Emperor Joseph I, but plans were ignored by his father. There were also negotiations for Victor Amadeus to wed Infanta Francisca Josefa of Portugal or Elisabeth Farnese.

Victor Amadeus died in Turin on 22 March 1715 having caught smallpox. He was buried at the Turin Cathedral and later moved to the Basilica of Superga outside Turin. His body is located in the Sala degli Infanti (Hall of the Infantes [children]). He was succeeded as Prince of Piedmont by his younger brother, Charles Emmanuel.

Ancestry

References

Sources

 
 
 
 
 

1699 births
1715 deaths
Nobility from Turin
Princes of Savoy
Deaths from smallpox
Heirs apparent who never acceded
Regents of Savoy
Princes of Piedmont
17th-century Italian nobility
18th-century Italian nobility
Italian royalty
Burials at the Basilica of Superga
Royalty and nobility who died as children
Sons of kings